Theo van Vroonhoven (born 15 May 1940) is a Dutch field hockey player. He competed at the 1960 Summer Olympics, the 1964 Summer Olympics and the 1968 Summer Olympics.

References

External links
 

1940 births
Living people
Dutch male field hockey players
Olympic field hockey players of the Netherlands
Field hockey players at the 1960 Summer Olympics
Field hockey players at the 1964 Summer Olympics
Field hockey players at the 1968 Summer Olympics
Sportspeople from Venlo